The Stunt Man is a 1980 American action comedy film directed by Richard Rush, starring Peter O'Toole, Steve Railsback, and Barbara Hershey. The film was adapted by Lawrence B. Marcus and Rush from the 1970 novel of the same name by Paul Brodeur. It tells the story of a young fugitive who hides as a stunt double on the set of a World War I movie whose charismatic director will do seemingly anything for the sake of his art.

It was nominated for three Academy Awards: Best Actor in a Leading Role (Peter O'Toole), Best Director (Richard Rush), and Best Writing, Screenplay Based on Material from Another Medium. However, due to its limited release, it never earned much attention from audiences at large. As O'Toole remarked in a DVD audio commentary, "The film wasn't released. It escaped."

The film has developed a cult following.

Plot

Cameron, a Vietnam veteran who's wanted for attempted murder, is caught by police but escapes. Crossing a bridge, he dodges a car that seems to be trying to run him down; when he turns around, the car has disappeared. A helicopter flies close to the bridge and a man inside looks at Cameron. Later, Cameron is attracted to a movie shoot — a World War I battle scene. Afterwards, he notices a woman who walks through the set greeting the actors, then falls in the water. Cameron dives in to rescue her and is horrified when she pulls off her face — a mask. She is the movie's leading actress, Nina Franklin, testing make-up for scenes set late in her character's life.

The director, Eli Cross, the man in the helicopter, descends from the sky on his camera crane. He offers Cameron a job, explaining that their last stunt man just ran a car off a bridge. They haven't found the body, and Eli can't afford the production delays if police get involved. The police chief is aware of the accident but Eli convinces him that Cameron is the stuntman. Cameron accepts the job.

Denise, the film's hair stylist, dyes Cameron's hair in order to make him resemble the leading man, Raymond Bailey, and harder to recognize. Cameron is convinced Eli is selling him out to the police but Eli reassures him that he is not. Cameron learns from Chuck, the stunt coordinator, and films a scene where he is chased across the roof of a large building and falls through a skylight into a bordello. At the same time, Cameron gets involved with Nina, who once had a romance with Eli. Eli is jealous of Cameron.

The last shoot at the current location involves Cameron's most difficult stunt, driving off a bridge and escaping under water — the same scene Burt was shooting when he died. Cameron believes Eli is trying to kill him, and will use the stunt to make it look like an accident.

The morning before the shoot Cameron tells Nina he planned to open an ice cream shop when he got home from Vietnam with a friend, but his friend did not want Cameron around because Cameron's girlfriend had left Cameron for the friend. Enraged, Cameron destroyed the ice cream shop. When a cop showed up Cameron knocked him out, resulting in an attempted murder charge. Nina and Cameron plan to escape together: Nina will hide in the trunk of the car, which Cameron will drive away in the morning instead of driving off the bridge.

Chuck has planted an explosive in one of the tires to make the car's tumble look more realistic. Cameron starts the scene too early. The car goes into the water when Chuck triggers the exploding tire, and Cameron scrambles to reach Nina in the trunk, until he looks out the window and sees Nina with Eli on the bridge. Cameron emerges and notices there were divers in the water with him all the time. Nina tells him that she was found in the trunk hours before the shoot, and Eli told her Cameron had decided to do the stunt. Eli explains that he would not let Cameron run off thinking he was trying to kill him. The best way to convince Cameron of Eli's good will, Eli felt, was to make sure Cameron got through the stunt in one piece. Cameron, though furious, is amused and relieved to survive. Cameron and Eli bicker over Cameron's pay and plan to catch a plane to the production's next location.

Cast

Production
During the early 1970s, Columbia Pictures owned film rights to the novel, with Arthur Penn and François Truffaut considered for directing it. Columbia offered the film to Richard Rush on the strength of the success of his previous film, Getting Straight. Rush initially rejected, then ultimately accepted directing The Stunt Man.

In July 1971, Columbia announced that Rush would direct the film with William Castle executive producer.

Rush then penned a 150-page treatment different from the book; in the novel, the characters were all crazy, and in the screenplay, they were instead "sane in a world gone mad." Columbia executives then rejected the script, saying it was difficult to find a genre to place it in. Said Rush: "They couldn't figure out if it was a comedy, a drama, if it was a social satire, if it was an action adventure...and, of course, the answer was, 'Yes, it's all those things.' But that isn't a satisfactory answer to a studio executive." Rush then bought the film rights from Columbia and shopped the film to other studios, to no avail. Funding for the picture finally came from Melvin Simon who had made a fortune in real estate.

Production took place in 1978. Opening scenes were filmed at Mary Etta's Cafe, Flinn Springs, California. Many scenes were filmed in and around the historic Hotel del Coronado in Coronado, California.

Peter O'Toole mentions in his DVD commentary that he based his character on David Lean who directed him in Lawrence of Arabia.

Reception
, the comedy drama film held a 90% "Fresh" rating on Rotten Tomatoes based on 40 reviews. The critics consensus states, "The Stunt Man is a preposterously entertaining thriller with a clever narrative and Oscar-worthy (nomination, at least!) Peter O'Toole performance."

Roger Ebert wrote "there was a great deal in it that I admired... [but] there were times when I felt cheated". He gave the film two stars but noted that others had "highly recommended" it. In an October 17, 1980, review in The New York Times, Janet Maslin noted "the film's cleverness is aggressive and cool," but concluded that although "the gamesmanship of The Stunt Man is fast and furious... gamesmanship is almost all it manages to be". Jay Scott called it "[t]he best movie about making a movie ever made, but the achievement merely begins there. ... Imagine a picture an eight-year-old and Wittgenstein could enjoy with equal fervor." Critic Pauline Kael considered it "a virtuoso piece of kinetic moviemaking" and rated it one of year's best films. She called O'Toole's comic performance "peerless".

Awards 
 Montreal World Film Festival – Grand Prix des Amériques (Best Film) for Richard Rush
 Golden Globe awards – Best Original Score for Dominic Frontiere
 National Society of Film Critics Awards – Best Actor for Peter O'Toole

Nominations 
The Stunt Man received three Oscar nominations:
 Best Director – Richard Rush
 Best Actor – Peter O'Toole
 Best Adapted Screenplay – Lawrence B. Marcus, Richard Rush

Home media
The Stunt Man was released on DVD on November 20, 2001 in two versions by Anchor Bay Entertainment. The first version is a standard release featuring two deleted scenes and a commentary by director Richard Rush. The second version is a limited edition (100,000 copies) containing everything from the standard release as well as the 2000 documentary The Sinister Saga of Making "The Stunt Man".

The film's theme song "Bits & Pieces" is sung by Dusty Springfield.

See also

List of films featuring fictional films

References

External links
 
 
 
 

1980 films
1980s action comedy-drama films
1980s black comedy films
1980s comedy thriller films
20th Century Fox films
American action comedy films
American black comedy films
American comedy thriller films
1980s English-language films
Films about filmmaking
Films about stunt performers
Films based on American novels
Films directed by Richard Rush
Films scored by Dominic Frontiere
Films shot in San Diego
1980 comedy films
1980s American films